

191001–191100 

|-bgcolor=#f2f2f2
| colspan=4 align=center | 
|}

191101–191200 

|-bgcolor=#f2f2f2
| colspan=4 align=center | 
|}

191201–191300 

|-id=282
| 191282 Feustel || 2003 FS || Andrew Feustel (born 1965), American/Canadian NASA astronaut and member of the crew who serviced the Hubble Telescope during space shuttle mission STS-125 in 2009 || 
|}

191301–191400 

|-id=341
| 191341 Lánczos ||  || Kornél Lánczos (1893–1974), a Hungarian physicist and mathematician.  || 
|}

191401–191500 

|-id=494
| 191494 Berndkoch ||  || Bernd Koch (born 1955), German physicist, amateur astronomer and a discoverer of minor planets || 
|}

191501–191600 

|-id=582
| 191582 Kikadolfi ||  || Federica Dolfi (born 1971), Italian amateur astronomer and collaborator at the Pistoia Mountains Astronomical Observatory || 
|}

191601–191700 

|-bgcolor=#f2f2f2
| colspan=4 align=center | 
|}

191701–191800 

|-bgcolor=#f2f2f2
| colspan=4 align=center | 
|}

191801–191900 

|-id=856
| 191856 Almáriván ||  || Iván Almár (born 1932), Hungarian astronomer and space scientist, who proposed the San Marino Scale || 
|-id=857
| 191857 Illéserzsébet ||  || Erzsébet Illés (born 1936), Hungarian astronomer and planetary scientist || 
|}

191901–192000 

|-bgcolor=#f2f2f2
| colspan=4 align=center | 
|}

References 

191001-192000